Hullville (also, Gravelly Valley) is a former settlement in Lake County, California. Hullville is a former settlement in Lake County, California. Hullville was located 3 miles east-southeast of Bear Mountain, It was inundated by Lake Pillsbury.

The Gravelly Valley post office opened in 1874, changed its name to Hullville in 1889, and closed in 1935.

See also
 Ghost town

References

Former settlements in Lake County, California
Former populated places in California
Destroyed towns
Submerged settlements in the United States
1874 establishments in California